The Reason Why is a 2010 album by Little Big Town

The Reason Why	may also refer to

Songs
 "The Reason Why", a song by Tommy Bruce 1969
 "The Reason Why", a song by the Byrds from the album Preflyte
 "The Reason Why", a song by Daryl Hall With Gulliver 1977
 "The Reason Why", a song by Vince Gill from These Days (Vince Gill album)
 "The Reason Why", title track from The Reason Why (album) by Little Big Town
 "The Reason Why" (song), a song by Italian singer-songwriter Lorenzo Fragola, released as a single in 2014

Books
 The Reason Why, a 1953 popular history book about the Charge of the Light Brigade by Cecil Woodham-Smith
 The Reason Why: An Anthology of the Murderous Mind, a 1995 non-fiction book by Ruth Rendell

Films
The Reason Why (film), a 1918 American drama film directed by Robert G. Vignola